Sadi and its variant Saadi are used as a masculine given name and a surname. People with the name include:

Given name

Sadi 
 Sadi Celil Cengiz (born 1983), Turkish actor
 Sadi Dastarac (1888–1911), French football player
 Sadi Gülçelik (1929–1980), Turkish basketball player, civil engineer and entrepreneur
 Sadi Güven (born 1955), Turkish judge 
 Sadi Irmak (1904–1990), Turkish academic, politician and former Prime Minister
 Sadi Jalali (born 1995), Indian-born Canadian professional soccer player
 Sadi Kalabar (1901–1960), Yugoslav chess player
 Sadi Pol Lallemand (1927–2009), known as Fats Sadi, Belgian jazz musician
 Sadi Mohammad, Bangladeshi singer and composer

Saadi
 Al-Saadi Gaddafi (born 1973), Libyan football player 
 Saadi Al Munla (1890–1975), Lebanese politician 
 Saâdi Radouani (born 1995), Algerian football player
 Saadi Shirazi (1210–1292), major Persian-language poet and writer
 Saadi Simawe (1946–2017), Iraqi-American author, teacher, and translator  
 Saadi Toma (born 1955), Iraqi football player
 Saadi Yacef (1928–2021), Algerian politician 
 Saadi Youssef (1934–2021), Iraqi writer and publisher

Surname

Sadi
 Amir Hamudi Hasan al-Sadi (born 1938), Iraqi chemical engineer and weapons developer 
 Amira Sadi (born 1994), Algerian volleyball player
 Dahiru Sadi (born 1963), Nigerian football player
 Dominic Sadi (born 2003), English football player
 Hakim Sadi (born 1992), Algerian athlete
 Joseph Sadi-Lecointe (1891–1944), French aviator
 Marie François Sadi Carnot (1837–1894), president of France 1887-1894 (nephew of Nicolas Léonard Sadi Carnot)
 Mohamed Sadi (born 1995), Libyan basketball player
 Nawaf Al-Sadi (born 2000), Saudi Arabian football player
 Nicolas Léonard Sadi Carnot (1796–1832), French physicist and thermodynamicist
 René Sadi (born 1948), Cameroonian politician 
 Saïd Sadi (born 1947), Algerian political activist
 Walid Muhammed Sadi (1939–2019), Jordanian diplomat

Saadi
 Ahmed Al Saadi, multiple people
 Dheyaa al-Saadi, Iraqi lawyer
 Elvira Saadi (born 1952) Soviet gymnast
 Idriss Saadi (born 1992), Algerian French football player
 Mohamed Obaid Al-Saadi (born 1994), Omani athlete
 Noureddine Saâdi (1950–2021), Algerian football manager 
 Osama Saadi (born 1963), Israeli lawyer and politician
 Ramón Saadi (born 1949), Argentine politician
 Samer Saadi (died 2005), member of the Al Aqsa Martyrs' Brigades 
 Suhayl Saadi (born 1961), Scottish author and physician
 Vicente Saadi (1913–1988), Argentine politician
 Wade E. Saadi, American philatelist 
 Youcef Saadi (born 1987), Algerian football player

Fictional characters
 Sadi, a eunuch in The Belgariad and The Malloreon series of novels

Turkish masculine given names
Arabic masculine given names
Surnames of Arabic origin